Richey Suncoast Theatre is a historic former movie theatre built in 1925 and later restored for use as a playhouse and community theatre in New Port Richey, Florida. It is named for silent film star Thomas Meighan and opened as the Meighan Theatre on July 1, 1926 with a screening of Meighan's movie The New Klondike. Meighan himself was not present but sent a congratulatory telegram.

In 1930 sound was added to the theatre. Meighan himself appeared to push the start button for the sound. The theatre closed in 1934 due to the Great Depression. It reopened in 1938 as a community theatre under the name The New Port Richey Theatre. : Richey Suncoast Theatre.

The theatre hosts the Black Maria Film and Video Festival.

Background
Meighan's interest in Florida developed after talks with his Realtor brother James E. Meighan. He bought property in Ocala, Florida in 1925. In 1927, he built a home in New Port Richey, Florida where he spent his winters. He intended to shoot his film We're All Gamblers there, however, filming was moved to Miami. The Meighans also hoped to draw other celebrities to the area. Meighan had a vision for New Port Richey to be an eastern U.S. version of Hollywood. This plan failed as the property boom in Florida busted in the 1920s and the 1929 stock market crash set off the period known as the Great Depression.

References

External links

 Richey Suncoast Theatre website

Buildings and structures in Pasco County, Florida
Theatres in Florida
Tourist attractions in the Tampa Bay area
Tourist attractions in Pasco County, Florida
Theatres completed in 1925
New Port Richey, Florida